Meglutol (INN, also known as 3-hydroxy-3-methylglutaric acid, β-hydroxy-β-methylglutaric acid, and dicrotalic acid) is a hypolipidemic agent.

It occurs free in Crotalaria dura and C. globifera and is bound in dicrotaline (pyrrolizidine alkaloid).

See also
Crotalaria
List of Crotalaria species
Mevalonic acid

Dicarboxylic acids
Hypolipidemic agents
Aldols